UCSF Benioff Children's Hospital Oakland formerly known as Children's Hospital Oakland, is a pediatric acute care hospital located in Oakland, California. The hospital has 191 beds and is affiliated with the UCSF School of Medicine. The hospital provides comprehensive pediatric specialties and subspecialties to infants, children, teens and young adults aged 0–21 throughout Northern California. UCSF Benioff Children's Hospital Oakland also features a Level 1 Pediatric Trauma Center, one of five in the state.

It has an affiliated research organization, the Children's Hospital Oakland Research Institute, or CHORI, and is involved in research and treatment for a variety of children's health issues, such as pediatric obesity, cancers, sickle cell disease, AIDS/HIV, hemophilia and cystic fibrosis.

History 

Bertha Wright founded the Baby Hospital, which later became the Children's Hospital Oakland, in 1912. Previously named Children's Hospital & Research Center Oakland, the hospital was renamed in 2014 after affiliating with UCSF Benioff Children's Hospital San Francisco.

In 2016, the UCSF Children's Hospital was ranked among the top 25 in eight of 10 hospital specialties in the U.S News & World Report's best pediatric hospitals listing.

Medical Training

Residency Program

Background 
UCSF Benioff Children's Hospital Oakland is a teaching hospital with a three-year Pediatrics residency program, currently employing 78 residents in total. It has attracted medical students from more than 40 schools, who train within the hospital as well as in a number of associated hospitals and clinics.

Fellowship Programs
In addition to the Pediatrics residency program, UCSF Benioff Children's Hospital Oakland has accredited fellowship programs in Pediatric Critical Care Medicine, Pediatric Emergency Medicine, Pediatric Hematology/Oncology, Pediatric Infectious Disease, and Pediatric Pulmonary Medicine.

See also
List of hospitals in California

References

External links
Trauma Centers UCSF Benioff Children's Hospital Oakland has been verified as a Level 1 Pediatric Trauma Center by the American College of Surgeons (ACS)
 Marc and Lynne Benioff give UCSF $100 million more
 This hospital in the CA Healthcare Atlas A project by OSHPD
Guide to the Children's Hospital Medical Center Records, 1912-1999, at The Bancroft Library

Hospital buildings completed in 1912
Hospitals in Oakland, California
Children's hospitals in the United States
1912 establishments in California
Pediatric trauma centers